Ang Alamat ng Lawin is a 2002 Filipino fantasy swashbuckler film produced and directed by Fernando Poe Jr. — his final directorial work. The film stars Poe and Ina Raymundo along with new childstars Cathy Villar, Franklin Cristobal, Ryan Yamazaki, and Khen Kurillo.

Ang Alamat ng Lawin was released by FPJ Productions on December 25, 2002, as an official entry of the 28th Metro Manila Film Festival.

Cast

Fernando Poe Jr. as Lawin
Ina Raymundo as Camila
Cathy Villar as Rita
Franklin Cristobal as Pepe
Ryan Yamazaki as Kulas
Khen Kurillo as Boy
Romy Diaz
Augusto Victa
Alex Cunanan as Draka
William Romero as Apo Ermitanyo

Awards and nomination

References

External links

2002 films
2000s fantasy adventure films
Filipino-language films
Films directed by Fernando Poe Jr.
Films set in Manila
Films shot in Bataan
Films shot in Bohol
Films shot in Bulacan
Films shot in Manila
Films shot in Pampanga
Films shot in Rizal
Films shot in Zambales
2000s fantasy action films
Philippine fantasy films
Swashbuckler films